Liang Zilu (born 6 October 2004) is a Chinese para alpine skier who competed at the 2022 Winter Paralympics.

Career
Liang competed at the 2022 Winter Paralympics and won a bronze medal in the giant slalom sitting event.

References 

Living people
2004 births
Chinese male alpine skiers
Alpine skiers at the 2022 Winter Paralympics
Medalists at the 2022 Winter Paralympics
Paralympic bronze medalists for China
Paralympic medalists in alpine skiing
21st-century Chinese people